I Commit to Love is the debut solo studio album by American singer-songwriter Howard Hewett. It was released on June 25, 1986 via Elektra Records. The album serves his first release after he departed from the group Shalamar. Recording sessions for this ten-track album took place at nine various recording studios viz. Americayn Studios, Ground Control Studios, Larrabee Sound Studios, Le Gonks West, Mama Jo's, Nick's Place, Soundcastle, Studio 99 and Village Studios. Together with Hewett, George Duke, Stanley Clarke, Glen J. Barbee, Ross Vannelli and Monty Seward worked on the production of the album. 

The album spawned four hit singles: "I'm for Real", "Stay", "I Commit to Love" and "Say Amen". Its lead single, "I'm for Real", produced by Hewett and Clarke, reached number 90 on the US Billboard Hot 100 singles chart and number 2 on the Hot R&B/Hip-Hop Songs chart. "Stay", the title track "I Commit to Love" and "Say Amen" also made it to the Hot R&B/Hip-Hop Songs chart, peaking at number 8, number 12 and number 54 respectively. The album peaked at number 159 on the US Billboard 200 album chart and at number 14 on the Top R&B/Hip-Hop Albums chart.

Track listing

Personnel and credits 
Musicians

 Howard Hewett – lead vocals, backing vocals (1–3, 5–10)
 Ed Grenga – keyboards (1, 3), guitars (1), drum programming (1)
 George Duke – keyboards (2, 7, 8), strings (2, 7, 8)
 Monty Seward – keyboards (4, 6, 9, 10), drum programming (10)
Joseph "Joey" Gallo – keyboards (4), drum programming (4)
 Robert Brookins – keyboards (5)
 Todd Cochran – keyboards (5)
 Raymond A. Crossley – keyboards (6)
 Kevin Grady – keyboards (6), drum programming (6)
 John Joseph Barnes – keyboards (9)
 Paul Jackson Jr. – guitars (2–4, 6–10)
 Kevin Chokan – guitars (5)
 Stanley Clarke – bass (2)
 Gerald Albright – bass (9, 10)
 Tris Imboden – drums (2, 3, 5, 9)
 Paulinho da Costa – percussion (8)
 Ronald Bruner Jr. – tom-tom overdubs (10)
 Wilton Felder – saxophone sol (2)
 George Howard – saxophone solo (7)
 Josie James – backing vocals (1, 3–10)
 Ross Vannelli – backing vocals (1, 3)
 Glen J. Barbee – backing vocals (4, 6)
 Nadia Deleye – backing vocals (4)
 Nicole Krauss – backing vocals (4)
 Alejandra Loiaza – backing vocals (4)
 Carolyn Vigiga – backing vocals (4)
 Gwen Evans – backing vocals (6)
 Deniece Williams – backing vocals (10)

Production

 Howard Hewett – producer (1–5, 7, 9, 10), engineer (1)
 Ross Vannelli – producer (1, 3),  engineer (1, 3, 10)
 Stanley Clarke – producer (2, 5)
 Glen J. Barbee – producer (4, 6)
 George Duke – producer (7, 8)
 Monty Seward – producer (9, 10)
 Frank Byron Clark – mixing (1, 4, 6, 9, 10), engineer (6, 9, 10)
 Darwin Foye – engineer (2, 4–6, 9, 10)
 Steve Hodge – engineer (2, 5)
 Csaba Petocz – engineer (2, 5)
 Tommy Vicari – mixing (2, 3)
 Paul Ratajczak – engineer (2, 5, 6, 9, 10), mixing, (5)
 Ed Grenga – engineer (3)
 Steven Bradley Ford – engineer (4, 6, 10), mixing (10)
 Nyya Lark – engineer (4, 6, 10)
 Jack Rouben – engineer (4)
 Erik Zobler – engineer (4, 7, 8), mixing (7, 8)
 Mitch Gibson – engineer (7)
 Tom Perry – engineer (7)
 Bernie Grundman – mastering at Bernie Grundman Mastering (Hollywood, California)
 Bob Defrin – art direction
 Carol Bobolts – design

Charts

Weekly charts

Year-end charts

References

External links 

I Commit to Love by Howard Hewett on iTunes

1986 albums
Elektra Records albums
Albums produced by George Duke
Albums produced by Stanley Clarke